Renate Diemers was a German politician of the Christian Democratic Union (CDU) and former member of the German Bundestag.

Life 
She joined the CDU in 1966 and the CDA in 1973. From 1990 to 2002 she was a member of the German Bundestag. During her time as a member of parliament, she was a member of the Committee on Family, Senior Citizens, Women and Youth, the Committee on Post and Telecommunications and the Enquete Commission on Demographic Change.

References

External links 

1938 births
Living people
Members of the Bundestag for North Rhine-Westphalia
Members of the Bundestag 1998–2002
Members of the Bundestag 1994–1998
Members of the Bundestag 1990–1994
Female members of the Bundestag
20th-century German women politicians
Members of the Bundestag for the Christian Democratic Union of Germany
21st-century German women politicians